Dorna is a village in Wittenberg district in Saxony-Anhalt, Germany. Since January 2007, it belongs to the town of Kemberg.

Geography and transport 
Through the community runs the Federal Highway (Bundesstraße) B 187 between Wittenberg and Torgau. South of the community is the Düben Heath.

Politics 

The last mayor of Dorna was Martina Ritter, first elected on 19 January 1994.

History 
The community lay until 1815 in the Saxon Amt of Wittenberg, and next passed to the Prussian province of Saxony. In 1513, the community's name was recorded as Dornow.

External links
Administrative community's website

Former municipalities in Saxony-Anhalt
Kemberg